Ricardo López may refer to:

 Ricardo Alonso López, Mexican footballer
 Ricardo López (boxer) (born 1966), Mexican boxer
 Ricardo López (politician) (born 1937), Spanish-born Canadian politician
 Ricardo López (stalker) (1975–1996), Uruguayan-born American stalker of musician Björk
 Ricardo López Aranda (1934–1996), Spanish playwright
 Ricardo López Cepero (born c. 1978), Puerto Rican politician and former mayor of Culebra
 Ricardo López Felipe (born 1971), Spanish football player
 Ricardo López Jordán (1822–1889), Argentine soldier and politician
 Ricardo López Méndez (1903–1989), Mexican poet and lyricist
 Ricardo López Murphy (born 1951), Argentine economist and politician
 Ricardo López Tugendhat, (born 1977) an Ecuadorian IPSC competition shooter